Simone Facchinetti (born 1972) is an Italian art historian.

Born in Bergamo, he graduated from Milan University in modern art history in 2000. He then studied for a doctorate on Roberto Longhi's Carlo Braccesco, editing the critical edition of Braccesco's work, published in 2008. In 2002 he won the Premio Internazionale Sergio Polillo.

He was curator of the Museo Adriano Bernareggi in Bergamo from 2000 to 2018 and from 2019 onwards has taught art history at Salento University. He has also co-curated two exhibitions at London's Royal Academy of Arts (that on Giovan Battista Moroni in 2014, revived at the Frick Collection in 2019 as Moroni. The Riches of Renaissance Portraiture, along with In the Age of Giorgione in 2016). He has also collaborated with Alias-D on il manifesto and with "Il Giornale dell'Arte".

Works 
 
 
 
 
 
 
  
 Chiara Frugoni and Simone Facchinetti, Senza misericordia. Il Trionfo della Morte e la Danza macabra a Clusone (Einaudi: Torino, 2016),

References

Living people
1972 births
Writers from Bergamo
University of Milan alumni
Academic staff of the University of Salento
Italian art historians